Patrick James Zurek (born 17 August 1948) is an American prelate of the Catholic Church.  He has served as Bishop of Amarillo since February 22, 2008. He previously served as an auxiliary bishop of the Archdiocese of San Antonio from 1998 to 2008.

Biography

Early life 
Patrick Zurek was born on August 17, 1948 in Sealy, Texas, to Arnold and Victoria (Bohac) Zurek.  His siblings were Lawrence Zurek and Dennis Zurek. Patrick Zurek attended the University of St. Thomas in Houston, where he received a Bachelor of Science degree in Mathematics, magna cum laude. He then attended St. Mary's Seminary in Houston, where he obtain a Bachelor of Sacred Theology degree in 1974.

Priesthood 
Zurek was ordained a priest for the Diocese of Austin in Rome in St. Peter's Basilica on June 29, 1975, by Pope Paul VI. He obtained his Licentiate in Moral Theology in 1976 at the Pontifical University of Saint Thomas Aquinas in Rome. Zurek also worked as a chaplain at the Bambino Gesù Hospital in Rome during his seminary days.  

After his return to Texas in 1976, Zurek held several pastoral assignments in Texas parishes:

 Associate pastor at St. Mary’s in Temple (1976 to 1979)
 Associate pastor at St. Joseph’s in Bryan (1979 to 1982) 
 Pastor at St. Thomas Aquinas in College Station (1982 to 1992)
 Pastor of St. John Neumann in Austin, Texas (1992 to 1998)

Zurek served on the board of the directors of missions, the Assumption Seminary, and the Ad Hoc Committee for the Spanish-language Bible. He also led the National Conference of Diocesan Vocation Directors.

Auxiliary Bishop of San Antonio

On January 5, 1998, Zurek was appointed as an auxiliary bishop of the Archdiocese of San Antonio and titular bishop of Thamugadi by Pope John Paul II.  Zurek was consecrated by Archbishop Patrick F. Flores on February 16, 1998.

As bishop, Zurek participated in numerous charity events, including one for 13 area Catholic schools that raised $230,000.  He has also appeared on television con-celebrating mass between the Archdiocese of San Antonio and the Archdiocese of Tegucigalpa in Honduras.

Bishop of Amarillo
On January 3, 2008, Pope Benedict XVI appointed Zurek as bishop of the Diocese of Amarillo, replacing Bishop John Yanta.  Zurek was installed on February 22, 2008.Zurek speaks five languages, including Czech, Italian and Spanish.

On January 31, 2019, the diocese released a list of 30 clergy with credible allegations of sexual abuse.  Zurek made this statement.The Diocese of Amarillo seeks to express regret and apologizes for the failing and sins that have hurt the Church so deeply, especially in our most vulnerable members. The Diocese especially asks forgiveness for the failings of those who have held positions of leadership in the Church.

See also

 Catholic Church hierarchy
 Catholic Church in the United States
 Historical list of the Catholic bishops of the United States
 List of Catholic bishops of the United States
 Lists of patriarchs, archbishops, and bishops

References

External links
 Diocese of Amarillo
 National Conference of Diocesan Vocation Directors
 St. Thomas Aquinas Catholic Church

Episcopal succession

 

Living people
1948 births
People from Sealy, Texas
American people of Czech descent
21st-century Roman Catholic bishops in the United States
Roman Catholic bishops of Amarillo